Milan Obrenović (1770 – 16 December 1810) was a general (vojvoda) during the Serbian Revolution. He was the half-brother of Prince Miloš I of Serbia.

Life
He was the youngest child of Obren Martinović (died 1777) and Višnja Urošević (died 1817), having a brother, Jakov (1767–1817), and a sister, Stana (born 1773). His mother remarried Theodore Mihailović (died 1802), at Dobrinje in the district of Užice, they had three sons: Miloš, Jovan (1786–1850) and Jevrem (1790–1856).

When Milan died, Miloš adopted the surname Obrenović.

References

1770 births
1810 deaths
Serbian revolutionaries
People of the First Serbian Uprising
Serbian military leaders
19th-century Serbian people
Burials at Serbian Orthodox monasteries and churches